Notolibellula is a genus of dragonflies in the family Libellulidae, 
endemic to northern Australia.
The single known species is a medium-sized dragonfly with the male having a bluish thorax and a red end to his abdomen.

Species
The genus Notolibellula includes only one species:

 Notolibellula bicolor  - bicoloured skimmer

See also
 List of Odonata species of Australia

References

External links

Libellulidae
Anisoptera genera
Monotypic Odonata genera
Odonata of Australia
Endemic fauna of Australia
Taxa named by Günther Theischinger
Taxa named by J.A.L. (Tony) Watson
Insects described in 1977